André Fortin is a Canadian politician in Quebec, who was elected to the National Assembly of Quebec in the 2014 election. He represents the electoral district of Pontiac as a member of the Quebec Liberal Party.

Prior to his election to the legislature, Fortin was a director of government relations for Canadian telecommunications company Telus. He has also previously served as a political aide in the offices of Paul Martin, Jean Lapierre, Bill Graham and Ralph Goodale. Originally from Quyon, he currently resides in the Aylmer district of Gatineau.

References

External links
André Fortin
National Assembly profile

Quebec Liberal Party MNAs
Living people
French Quebecers
Politicians from Gatineau
University of Ottawa alumni
21st-century Canadian politicians
Members of the Executive Council of Quebec
Year of birth missing (living people)